Hingoli Deccan railway station is a railway station in Hingoli  in Marathwada region of the Maharashtra. Its code is HNL. It serves Hingoli city. The station consists of two platforms. The platforms are well sheltered. The station lies on Purna–Khandwa section of South Central Railway. It was in Hyderabad railway division of SCR and now is in Nanded railway division after bifurcation of Hyderabad railway division. Hingoli was connected to the broad-gauge railway network in 2008 when tracks were extended from Purna.

Amenities
Amenities at Hingoli railway station include: computerized reservation office, waiting room, benches,  and book stall.

See also

High-speed rail in India
Indian Railways
Hingoli District
Rail transport in India
List of railway stations in India

Doubling
Not Double line

External Links 
Departures from Hingoli India Rail Info
Indian Railway Map
 Ministry of Indian Railways, Official website
 Indian Railways Live Information, Official website
History of Electrification 
The Gazetteers Dept Maharashtra

References

Nanded railway division
Railway stations in Hingoli district
Railway stations opened in 1954